Salisbury Historic District is a national historic district located at Salisbury, Rowan County, North Carolina.  The district encompasses 348 contributing buildings and 1 contributing site in the central business district and surrounding residential sections of Salisbury.  It includes notable examples of Late Victorian, Colonial Revival, and Bungalow / American Craftsman style architecture. Located in the district are the separately listed Maxwell Chambers House, McNeely-Strachan House, Archibald Henderson Law Office, and the former Rowan County Courthouse.  Other notable buildings include the tower of the former First Presbyterian Church (1891-1893), Rowan County Courthouse (1914), Conrad Brem House, Kluttz's Drug Store (c. 1859), Bell Building (c. 1900), Washington Building (c. 1900), Grubb-Wallace Building, Hedrick Block, Empire Hotel, St. Luke's Episcopal Church (1827-1828), Soldiers Memorial A.M.E. Zion Church (1910-1913), U.S. Post Office and Courthouse (1909), City Hall (1926), Salisbury Fire House and City Building (1897).

It was listed on the National Register of Historic Places in 1975, with boundary increases in 1988, 1989, and 2000.

References

External links

Historic American Buildings Survey in North Carolina
Historic districts on the National Register of Historic Places in North Carolina
Victorian architecture in North Carolina
Colonial Revival architecture in North Carolina
Buildings and structures in Salisbury, North Carolina
National Register of Historic Places in Rowan County, North Carolina